Peters's climbing rat (Tylomys nudicaudus) is a species of rodent in the family Cricetidae.

It is found in Belize, El Salvador, Guatemala, Honduras, Mexico, and Nicaragua.

References

 Musser, G. G. and M. D. Carleton. 2005. Superfamily Muroidea. pp. 894–1531 in Mammal Species of the World a Taxonomic and Geographic Reference. D. E. Wilson and D. M. Reeder eds. Johns Hopkins University Press, Baltimore.

Tylomys
Rodents of Central America
Mammals described in 1866
Taxa named by Wilhelm Peters
Taxonomy articles created by Polbot